= Olisthaerus =

Scientific classification
- Kingdom: Animalia
- Phylum: Arthropoda
- Class: Insecta
- Order: Coleoptera
- Suborder: Polyphaga
- Infraorder: Staphyliniformia
- Family: Staphylinidae
- Genus: Olisthaerus; Dejean, 1833

Genus of beetles

Olisthaerus is a genus of beetles belonging to the family Staphylinidae.

The species of this genus are found in Europe and Northern America.

Species:

- Olisthaerus megacephalus (Zetterstedt, 1828)
- Olisthaerus substriatus (Paykull, 1790)
